Saint Joseph High School is a private Catholic all-girls high school located in Lakewood, California. It is located in the Roman Catholic Archdiocese of Los Angeles and sponsored by the Sisters of St. Joseph of Carondelet. Its brother school is St. John Bosco High School.

History
The high school was founded by the Sisters of St. Joseph of Carondelet (CSJ). It opened its doors on September 14, 1964, and was dedicated on May 5, 1967, by Cardinal James McIntyre who had asked the CSJ to open a school for girls in Lakewood. Since its founding, the school has graduated over 4,200 students. Class colors are green, blue, red, and yellow.

Recognitions and accreditations
Saint Joseph is a National Blue Ribbon School and is accredited by the Western Association of Schools and colleges (WASC) and the Western Catholic Education Association (WCEA).

Admissions to Saint Joseph is based on entrance examination, activities, arts and athletics. The admissions process is competitive. The school primarily accepts girls who are college bound. Admission decisions are based on interview of parents and (separately) the student; letters of recommendation from teachers; participation in activities, community service, arts and/or athletics; grades from elementary school, and entrance test scores.

Notable alumnae
Savannah DeMelo - professional soccer player for Racing Louisville FC
Ava DuVernay - film director
Lisa Fernandez - member of the United States Women Olympic Softball Team (1996, 2000, and 2004)
Leslie Sykes - morning weekday  co-anchor of the "Eyewitness News" at KABC-TV in Los Angeles.

References

External links

Home page

Girls' schools in California
Roman Catholic secondary schools in Los Angeles County, California
Educational institutions established in 1964
Lakewood, California
1964 establishments in California
Catholic secondary schools in California